Nathan T. Gunn (born November 26, 1970, in South Bend, Indiana) is an American operatic baritone who performs regularly around the world. He is an alumnus of the University of Illinois at Urbana-Champaign where he is currently a professor of voice.

He has appeared in many of the world's well-known opera houses, including the Metropolitan Opera in New York City, the San Francisco Opera, Lyric Opera of Chicago, Houston Grand Opera, Seattle Opera, the Dallas Opera, the Opera Company of Philadelphia, the Pittsburgh Opera, The Santa Fe Opera, The Royal Opera in London, the Paris Opéra, the Bavarian State Opera in Munich, Theater an der Wien in Vienna, Opera Theatre of Saint Louis, Teatro Real in Madrid, and the Théâtre Royal de la Monnaie in Brussels.  He has also appeared at the Glyndebourne Festival near London, the Ravinia Festival near Chicago, and the Mostly Mozart Festival in New York City.  In 2011, Gunn was featured as a guest star in the Mormon Tabernacle Choir's annual Christmas concert before an audience of 80,000 in Salt Lake City.  The concert was broadcast on PBS and was released as an album in 2012 entitled Once Upon a Christmas.

In August 2015, Gunn starred in the world premiere of a new opera presented by The Santa Fe Opera. It was Jennifer Higdon's Cold Mountain, based on the award-winning 1997 novel of the same name by Charles Frazier. Gunn's previous Santa Fe performances include a 1998 production of Berlioz’ Béatrice et Bénédict as well as a 1999 production of Richard Strauss’ Ariadne auf Naxos.

While he is noted for his vocal prowess and acting, Gunn has received almost as much fame for his physique, a peculiar feat for an opera singer.  He has been dubbed a "barihunk" although as a play on baritone and hunk, he has said he prefers the term "hunkitone." In 2008, he was featured in People magazine's list of "The Sexiest Men Alive."

Gunn was appointed a tenured professor of voice in 2007 at the University of Illinois School of Music, and in 2013 he was named general director of the Lyric Theater @ Illinois. In 2012 the Opera Company of Philadelphia appointed him director of its American Repertoire Council promoting new American works.  His wife, Julie Jordan Gunn, who holds a doctorate (A. Mus. D.) in vocal coaching and accompanying from University of Illinois, was also appointed associate professor in collaborative piano at the University.

Roles

Title role in Hamlet
Title role in Billy Budd
Title role in Eugene Onegin
Title role in Kullervo
Guglielmo in Così fan tutte
Figaro in Il barbiere di Siviglia
The Count in Le nozze di Figaro
Marcello in La bohème
Malatesta in Don Pasquale
Belcore in L'elisir d'amore
Ottone in L'incoronazione di Poppea
Tarquinius in The Rape of Lucretia
Oreste in Iphigénie en Tauride
Bénédict in Béatrice et Bénédict
Harlekin in Ariadne auf Naxos
Papageno in Die Zauberflöte
Zurga in Les pêcheurs de perles
Prince Andrei in War and Peace
Danilo Danilovitsch in The Merry Widow
Valentin in Faust
Gaylord Ravenal in Show Boat
Lancelot in Camelot
Billy Bigelow in Carousel
Title role in Sweeney Todd
Ríolobo in Florencia en el Amazonas
Clyde Griffiths in An American Tragedy
Buzz Aldrin in Man on the Moon
Father Delaura in Love and Other Demons
The Lodger in The Aspern Papers
James Dalton in A Harlot's Progress
Paul in Amelia
Alec Harvey in Brief Encounter
Ned Keene in Peter Grimes
Yeshua in The Gospel of Mary Magdalene
W. P. Inman in Cold Mountain (2015)
Sid Taylor in Great Scott (2015)

Notes

External links
 Official website 
 About Nathan Gunn
 Sony BMG Masterworks' Nathan Gunn Podcasts

1970 births
Living people
American operatic baritones
University of Illinois at Urbana–Champaign School of Music alumni
University of Illinois Urbana-Champaign faculty
Musicians from South Bend, Indiana
21st-century American singers
21st-century American male singers
Singers from Indiana
Classical musicians from Indiana